Batohiya (IAST: Baṭohīyā; transl. Foreigner) is a Bhojpuri poem written by Raghuveer Narayan in 1911. This Purbi song became very popular and George Abraham Grierson also recorded this song for Linguistic Survey of India in 1920. It has also been called the "Vande Matram" of Bhojpuri. The poem was first published in Raghuveer Patra Pushp.

The title Batohiya is a Bhojpuri word which means traveller. In this song an indentured laborer in British colony is explaining to a traveller about India as a heaven on the earth and he wants to visit his homeland. This song gained immense popularity in foreign countries like Mauritius, Suriname, and Fiji. Till 1970 this poem was on the cover of Hindi text book of class 11th and 12th published by Bihar State Textbook committee.

Etymology
The root of the word batohiya is Bhojpuri word bāṭ which means road or way. The one who travels on the road is called Batohi which in conjunction with Bhojpuri suffix -iya becomes Batohiya, which means traveller.

Lyrics
The first two verses of the poem read as follow:

English translation
English translation of first two verses are as follow:

Performances and interpretations
This song has been recorded several times, the oldest one was done by G.A. Girerson in 1920. This song has also been sung by Malini Awasthi, Chandan Tiwari, Raj Mohan and many renowned singers. Recently this song is sung by a group of singers, directed by Shushant Asthana and produced by Nitin Chandra, can be seen over internet.

References  

Bhojpuri-language culture
Indian poems
1911 poems